City Market, also known as the W.H. Brown Grocery and Central Cash & Carry, is a historic commercial building located at Louisiana, Pike County, Missouri. The original section was built about 1885, with a Romanesque-inspired arcaded storefront of rough stone dating from about 1900.  It is a two-story, rectangular, red brick building.  It features a decorative metal cornice and segmental arched windows.

It was listed on the National Register of Historic Places in 2005.

References

Commercial buildings on the National Register of Historic Places in Missouri
Romanesque Revival architecture in Missouri
Commercial buildings completed in 1900
Buildings and structures in Pike County, Missouri
National Register of Historic Places in Pike County, Missouri